Sheftalia is a traditional sausage from Cyprus made from caul fat, or omentum, the membrane that surrounds the stomach of pig or lamb, to wrap the ingredients rather than sausage casing.

References

External links

sheftalia sti kypro 

Skewered kebabs
Cypriot cuisine
Greek cuisine
Sausages